Daviesia oxyclada is a species of flowering plant in the family Fabaceae and is endemic to the south-west of Western Australia. It is a densely-branched, glabrous shrub with spiny stems, vertically compressed, triangular phyllodes with the narrower end towards the base, and yellow or orange flowers with red markings.

Description

Taxonomy and naming
Daviesia oxyclada was first formally described in 1995 by Michael Crisp in Australian Systematic Botany from specimens collected by Charles Chapman in the Irwin district in 1976. The specific epithet (oxyclada) means "sharp branch".

Distribution and habitat
This daviesia grows in kwongan between Moora, Eneabba and Mingenew in the Avon Wheatbelt and Geraldton Sandplains biogeographic regions of south-western Western Australia.

Conservation status
Daviesia oxyclada is listed as "not threatened" by the Government of Western Australia Department of Biodiversity, Conservation and Attractions.

References

oxyclada
Eudicots of Western Australia
Plants described in 1995
Taxa named by Michael Crisp